Tweeddale, Ettrick and Lauderdale was a constituency of the Scottish Parliament (Holyrood). It elected one Member of the Scottish Parliament (MSP) by the plurality (first past the post) method of election. Also, however, it was one of nine constituencies in the South of Scotland electoral region, which elected seven additional members, in addition to nine constituency MSPs, to produce a form of proportional representation for the region as a whole.

For the 2011 Scottish Parliament election, the seat of Tweeddale, Ettrick and Lauderdale was re-established as Ettrick, Roxburgh and Berwickshire and Midlothian South, Tweeddale and Lauderdale

Electoral region 

The other eight constituencies of the South of Scotland region were: Ayr, Carrick, Cumnock and Doon Valley, Clydesdale, Cunninghame South, Dumfries, East Lothian, Galloway and Upper Nithsdale and Roxburgh and Berwickshire.

The region covered the Dumfries and Galloway council area, the Scottish Borders council area, the South Ayrshire council area, part of the East Ayrshire council area, part of the East Lothian council area, part of the Midlothian council area, part of the North Ayrshire council area and part of the South Lanarkshire council area.

Constituency boundaries and council areas 

The Tweeddale, Ettrick and Lauderdale constituency was created at the same time as the Scottish Parliament, in 1999, with the name and boundaries of an  existing Westminster constituency. In 2005, however, Scottish Westminster (House of Commons) constituencies were mostly replaced with new constituencies.

The Holyrood constituency covered a western portion of the Scottish Borders council area and a western portion of the Midlothian council area. The rest of the Scottish Borders area were covered by the Roxburgh and Berwickshire constituency. The rest of the Midlothian area was covered by the Midlothian constituency, which was in the Lothians electoral region.

Boundary review 

Following their First Periodic review into constituencies for the Scottish Parliament, the Boundary Commission for Scotland recommendated altering the Tweedale, Ettrick, and Lauderdale constituency into a newly formed Midlothian South, Tweedale and Lauderdale seat.  The neighbouring constituency is an altered Ettrick, Roxburgh and Berwickshire seat.

Members of the Scottish Parliament

Election results

References 

Scottish Parliament constituencies and regions 1999–2011
1999 establishments in Scotland
Constituencies established in 1999
2011 disestablishments in Scotland
Constituencies disestablished in 2011
Politics of the Scottish Borders
Galashiels
Penicuik
Selkirk, Scottish Borders
Melrose, Scottish Borders
Earlston
Innerleithen
Peebles
Lauder